Charlie Girl is a musical comedy which premiered in the West End of London at the Adelphi Theatre on December 15, 1965 and became one of the most successful theatre shows of the day running for 2,202 performances. It closed on 27 March 1971.

Productions

Original production 
The original stars were Joe Brown (Joe Studholme), Christine Holmes (Charlie Hadwell), Anna Neagle (Lady Hadwell), Derek Nimmo (Nicholas Wainwright), Hy Hazell (Kay Connor), Jean Lloyd Grant Mostyn and Stuart Damon (Jack Connor). When Joe Brown left the show in 1968, he was replaced by Gerry Marsden (of Gerry & The Pacemakers).

Production credits included:
 Directed by Wallace Douglas
 Choreographed by Alfred Rodriques
 Setting by Tod Kingman
 Costumes by Cynthia Tingey
 Orchestrations by Arthur Wilkinson
 Musical Direction by Kenneth Alwyn
Neagle took the show to Australia in 1971 where English co-star Derek Nimmo appeared with popstar John Farnham co-starring as Joe Studholme.

Revival 
The show was revived in London in 1986 starring Paul Nicholas (Joe), Lisa Hull and later Bonnie Langford (Charlie Hadwell), Cyd Charisse (Lady Hadwell), Nicholas Parsons (Nicholas Wainwright), Dora Bryan (Kay Connor)  and Mark Wynter (Jack Connor), running for six months at the Victoria Palace Theatre.

Synopsis

Lady Hadwell, the widow of an aristocrat, is struggling to make ends meet by opening her home to the public. The youngest of her three daughters, Charlotte, known as "Charlie", is a tomboy. Their loyal assistant, Joe, is in love with Charlie. When he learns he has won a fortune on the football pools, he conceals the fact from his employers.  In the meantime, her mother is hoping for an engagement between Charlie and an American millionaire. In a comic moment (a parody of Cinderella), Charlie has to return her hired evening gown, and the rest of the guests at the ball also decide to cavort in their underwear.

1965 Cast Album Song List

Act I
 Overture - Charlie Girl
 Bells Will Ring
 What Would I Get From Being Married
 I Love Him, I Love Him
 What's the Magic
 Let's Do a Deal
 My Favourite Occupation
 I Was Young

Act II 	
 Party of a Lifetime
 I 'ates Money
 Charlie Girl Waltz
 Like Love
That's It
 Fish and Chips
You Never Know What You Can Do Until You Try It
Charlie Girl

1972 Australian Cast Recording

Charts

1986 Cast Album Song List

Act I
 Overture
 Most Ancestral Home of All
 Bells Will Ring
 Charlie Girl
 I Love Him, I Love Him (Bells Will Ring)
 What Would I Get From Being Married
 Let's Do a Deal
 My Favorite Occupation
 What's the Magic
 When I Hear Music, I Dance

Act II 	
 I 'ates Money
 Charlie Girl Waltz
 Party of a Lifetime
 Like Love
 That's It
 Washington
 Fish and Chips
 Society Twist
 You Never Know What You Can Do Until You Try
 Bells Will Ring/Charlie Girl (Reprise)
 Charlie Girl (Finale)

References

External links
The story of Charlie Girl at Guide to Musical Theatre

1965 musicals
British musicals